South Hurricane Township is one of twenty townships in Fayette County, Illinois, USA.  As of the 2010 census, its population was 308 and it contained 147 housing units.  This township, along with North Hurricane Township, was formed when Hurricane Township split sometime after 1921.

Geography
The township contains the southwest edge of Ramsey Lake State Recreation Area.

Cities, towns, villages
 Bingham

Unincorporated towns
 Bayle City

Cemeteries
The township contains these nine cemeteries: Cearlock, Donaldson, Fox, Harris, Isbell, Liberty, Nave, Poland and Pope.

Demographics

School districts
 Ramsey Community Unit School District 204

Political districts
 Illinois' 17th congressional district
 State House District 98
 State Senate District 49

References
 
 United States Census Bureau 2007 TIGER/Line Shapefiles
 United States National Atlas

External links
 City-Data.com
 Illinois State Archives

Townships in Fayette County, Illinois
Townships in Illinois